Peng Chau & Hei Ling Chau (Traditional Chinese: 坪洲及喜靈洲) is one of the 10 constituencies in the Islands District in Hong Kong. The constituency returns one district councillor to the Islands District Council, with an election every four years.

Peng Chau & Hei Ling Chau constituency is loosely based on islands of Peng Chau, Hei Ling Chau, Sunshine Island, Kau Yi Chau and Nim Shue Wan on Lantau Island with an estimated population of 6,622.

Councillors represented

Election results

2010s

2000s

1990s

References

Peng Chau
Hei Ling Chau
Discovery Bay
Constituencies of Hong Kong
Constituencies of Islands District Council
1994 establishments in Hong Kong
Constituencies established in 1994